The Durg–Jammu Tawi Express is an Express train belonging to South East Central Railway zone that runs between  and  in India. It is currently being operated with 18215/18216 train numbers on a weekly basis.

Service

The 18215/Durg–Jammu Tawi Express has an average speed of 53 km/hr and covers 1937 km in 36h 35m. The 18216/Jammu Tawi–Durg Express has an average speed of 51 km/hr and covers 1937 km in 38h 10m.

Route & Halts 

The important halts of the train are:

Coach composition

The train has standard ICF rakes with a max speed of 110 kmph. The train consists of 21 coaches :

 1 First AC 
 2 AC II Tier
 2 AC III Tier
 8 Sleeper Coaches
 6 General Unreserved
 2 Seating cum Luggage Rake

Traction

Both trains are hauled by a Ghaziabad Loco Shed-based WAP-5 electric locomotive from Durg to Amritsar. From Amritsar trains are hauled by a Ludhiana Loco Shed-based WDM-3A diesel locomotive uptil Pathankot. From Pathankot trains are hauled by a Ghaziabad Loco Shed-ased WAP-5 electric locomotive uptil Jammu,and vice versa.

Rake sharing

The train shares its rake with 18213/18214 Durg–Jaipur Weekly Express.

Direction reversal

The train reverses its direction 1 times:

See also 

 Durg Junction railway station
 Jammu Tawi railway station
 Durg–Jaipur Weekly Express

Notes

References

External links 

 18215/Durg–Jammu Tawi Express
 18216/Jammu Tawi–Durg Express

Transport in Durg
Transport in Jammu
Express trains in India
Rail transport in Chhattisgarh
Rail transport in Madhya Pradesh
Rail transport in Rajasthan
Railway services introduced in 2014